Regulator of G-protein signaling 2 is a protein that in humans is encoded by the RGS2 gene. It is part of a larger family of RGS proteins that control signalling through G-protein coupled receptors (GPCR).

Function 

RGS2 is thought to have protective effects against myocardial hypertrophy as well as atrial arrhythmias. Increased stimulation of Gs coupled β1-adrenergic receptors and Gq coupled α1-adrenergic receptors in the heart can result in cardiac hypertrophy. In the case of Gq protein coupled receptor (GqPCR) mediated hypertrophy, Gαq will activate the intracellular affectors phospholipase Cβ and rho guanine nucleotide exchange factor to stimulate cell processes which lead to cardiomyocyte hypertrophy. RGS2 functions as a GTPase Activating Protein (GAP) which acts to increase the natural GTPase activity of the Gα subunit.  By increasing the GTPase activity of the Gα subunit, RGS2 promotes GTP hydrolysis back to GDP, thus converting the Gα subunit back to its inactive state and reducing its signalling ability. Both GsPCR and GqPCR activation can contribute to cardiac hypertrophy via activation of MAP Kinases as well. RGS2 has been shown to decrease phosphorylation of those MAP kinases and therefore decrease their activation in response to Gαs signalling.

In the case of GsPCR mediated hypertrophy, the main mechanism by which signalling contributes to hypertrophy is through the Gβγ subunit; Gαs signalling by itself is not sufficient.  Nevertheless, RGS2 has been shown to inhibit Gs mediated hypertrophy. The mechanism of how RGS2 regulates increased Gβγ signalling is not well understood, apart from the fact that it is unrelated to RGS2's GAP function. A deficiency in RGS2 has been linked with increased cardiac hypertrophy in mice. RGS2 deficient hearts appear normal until confronted with an increased workload, to which they respond readily with increased Gαq signalling and hypertrophy.
 
Gαs subunits increase adenyl cyclase activity, which in turn leads to cAMP accumulation in the myocyte nucleus to trigger hypertrophy. RGS2 regulates the effects of increased Gαs signalling through its GAP function. Stimulation of GsPCRs  not only leads to hypertrophy but it has also been shown to selectively induce higher expression levels of RGS2 which in turn, protects against hypertrophy, providing a mechanism for maintaining homeostatic conditions.

There has also been some evidence of a role of RGS2 in atrial arrhythmias where RGS2 deficient mice exhibited prolonged and greater susceptibility to electrically induced atrial fibrillation. This was attributed to a decrease in RGS2's inhibitory effects on Gq coupled M3 muscarinic receptor signalling, resulting in increased Gαq activity. The M3 muscarinic receptor normally activates delayed rectifier potassium channels in the atria, thus increased Gαq activity is thought to result in an altered potassium flux, a decreased refractory period, increased chance of current re-entry and inappropriate contraction.

Interactions 

RGS2 has been shown to interact with PRKG1 and ADCY5.

References

Further reading